MBC Action (stylized as MBCACTION) is a free-to-air television channel that MBC Group’s action-packed channel that targets young Arabic males. It delivers the best in high-octane Western series, movies and action. shows and sports and anime and action movies and films and television series and television programs and films from action genre. Subtitled in Arabic language, the channel is a part of the Middle Eastern media company MBC Group. It is intended to aim mainly at male audiences, unlike its sister channel MBC 4 which is aimed at female audiences. A channel that targets young Arab males. It delivers Western series, movies, action reality shows as well as Japanese anime and sports programs. MBC ACTION (an indigenous adrenaline-packed channel targeting young males); MBC Action launched in 2007 with the latest action packed movies, dramas and thrillers targeting young Arab males. The new addition proved to be an instant success. Since then, it has been growing aggressively and even more so since it started developing localized content that appeals to the passions of Arab men. The channel is also considered, the only Arab male entertainment destination in the region; delivering a focused and dynamic 360 experience, which extends out of TV, into on-ground, online and social media. Some of its prime time shows include The Mentalist (exclusive on MBC Action), The Vampire Diaries (exclusive on MBC Action), Fringe (Exclusive on MBC Action), V (exclusive on MBC Action), The Mentalist, The Vampire Diaries, Fringe, Supernatural, V, WWE and True Blood. MBC Action also offers themed nights including Bollywood Action Nights (thrilling Bollywood experiences), The channel recently which is a weekly "magazine" format show about cars, similar to Top Gear, which they also broadcast the British and American versions of the BBC's Top Gear, MBC Action (an indigenous adrenaline-packed channel with action series and movies). carsIt was launched on 5 March 2007. with the Pilot episode of the TV series Lost which, along with Prison Break and The 4400, is one of MBC Action's biggest coups. MBC Action's biggest coups are the TV series Lost, Prison Break and The 4400. It will also show new episodes of other shows like 24, Pimp My Ride, The Sparticle Mystery and the Power Rangers. It is aimed mainly at male audiences, . The channel also airs the International Fight League. It also shows action movies on a daily basis. It is aimed mainly at male audiences, unlike its sister channel MBC 4 which is aimed at female audiences.

On 1 July 2011, MBC Action HD was launched.

Programming

Shows 
 Action News
 Action Zone
 Around the World in 80 Tricks
 Car Crash
 Car Crash TV
 Cash Pad
 Clipaholics
 The Donut Show
 EA Sports Game Time
 Extreme Fails
 F2: Tackling Europe
 Good Food America
 Kill Rob Bailey
 The Inside Line
 The Inside Line Specials
 Sneaker Shopping
 Sports Dads
 National Icons
 Must Haves
 Musthaves
 Planet Action
 Ridiculous Rides
 Take the Tower
 Tech Toys
 Tech Toys 360
 Tricked USA
 What Happens Next
 Workout From Within with Jeff Halevy

Drama 
 24
 The 4400
 The A-Team
 Alcatraz
 Alias
 Allegiance
 Almost Human
 Angel
 Atlantis
 Aaron Stone
 Ballers
 Burn Notice
 Battle Creek
 Better Call Saul
 The Blacklist
 Blue Bloods
 Bones
 Buffy the Vampire Slayer
 Californication
 Classified
 Cold Case
 CSI: Crime Scene Investigation
 CSI: Miami
 CSI: NY
 The Dead Zone
 The District
 The Dukes of Hazzard
 Entourage
 The Enemy Within
 Extant
 Flashpoint
 Fringe
 Game of Thrones
 Harper's Island
 Hawaii Five-0
 In Plain Sight
 The Inside
 Jake 2.0
 Justified
 Jericho
 Karen Sisco
 Killer Instinct
 Killjoys
 Kyle XY
 Las Vegas
 La Fortuna
 Law & Order
 Law & Order
 Law & Order: Criminal Intent
 Law & Order: LA
 Law & Order: Special Victims Unit
 Law & Order: Trial by Jury
 Law & Order True Crime
 Law & Order: UK
 The Leftovers
 Lost
 Lie to Me
 The Magicians
 Martial Law
 Medical Investigation
 The Mentalist
 Miami Vice
 M.I. High
 Nash Bridges
 Numb3rs
 NCIS
 NCIS
 NCIS: Los Angeles
 Newton's Cradle
 The Night Manager
 Nikita
 Outlander
 Prison Break 
 Reckless
 Robbery Homicide Division
 Rome
 Rush
 Shark
 Scooter: Secret Agent
 Star-Crossed
 Supernatural
 The Sarah Jane Adventures
 Terminator: The Sarah Connor Chronicles
 Threshold
 The Tomorrow People
 True Detective
 Tower Prep
 Under the Dome
 The Unit
 V
 The Vampire Diaries
 The Wire
 The Wall: Cover Your Tracks
 The Wall 2: The Chateau Murder
 Without a Trace
 Women's Murder Club
 The X-Files
 The Zack Files

Spanish drama 
 Desaparecidos
 El ministerio del tiempo
 Isabel
 La caza
 Loghz Al Jazeera
 La bella y las bestias
 La Piloto
 La Fortuna
 La casa de papel
 Money Heist
 Néboa
 Presunto culpable
 Stolen Away
 Traición
 Unauthorized Living

Spanish-language drama 
 La bella y las bestias
 La Piloto

Japanese series 
Chouseishin Gransazer
Ganbare!! Robocon
Kamen Rider Ryuki
Jin
Masked Rider Ex Aid
Ultraman Ginga

Italian series 
 Back To The Island

Indian series 
 Chittod Ki Rani Padmini Ka Johur
 Ek Hasina Thi
 Saraswatichandra

Telenovelas 
 Deus Salve o Rei

Korean drama 
 Are You Human?
 Are You Human Too?
 Bridal Mask
 Bad Guys
 City Hunter
 Dae Jang Geum
 Doom at Your Service
 He Is Psychometric
 Hotel del Luna
 Hotel Del Luna
 House of Lies
 Jewel in the palace
 Jewel in the Palace
 The King of Legend
 Lawless Lawyer
 Love in the Moonlight
 Mouse
 My Secret Terrius
 The Red Sleeve
 Rose Mansion
 Secret Door
 Signal
 The Slave Hunters
 Voice
 Undercover

Brazilian drama 
 Dupla Identidade
 Justiça
 Sob Pressão
 Treze Dias Longe do Sol

Chinese drama  
 Armor Hero
 Genghis Khan
 Three Kingdoms
 The Sword And The Chess of Death

Reality 
 The Amazing Race
 America's Got Talent: Extreme
 Brainiac: Science Abuse
 Bullrun
 The Carbonaro Effect
 The Carbonaro Effect Specials
 The Dude Perfect Show
 I Shouldn't Be Alive
 Running Wild with Bear Grylls
 Revenge Prank
 Lip Sync Battle
 Troy
 Tricked
 Tricky TV
 truTV Presents: World's Dumbest...
 World's Wildest Police Videos

Talk shows 
 Hot Ones

Clip shows 
 Car Crash
 Car Crash TV
 Clipaholics
 Extreme Fails
 Most Daring
 Most Shocking
 Ridiculousness
 Top 20 Countdown: Most Shocking
 TruTV Top Funniest
 World's Most Amazing Videos

Game shows 
 The Almost Impossible Gameshow
 Fear Factor
 Wipeout

Animation 
 Spider-Man: The New Animated Series
 The Cleveland Show
 Family Guy
 MTV Spider-Man 2003
 The Simpsons
 Spider-Man 2003

Miniseries 
 Thief

Sitcoms 
 Ace Lightning
 Two and a Half Men
 Level Up
 The League
 Jonas
 The Thundermans
 Fred: The Show
 Drake & Josh
 Gaming Show (In My Parents' Garage)
 Ned's Declassified School Survival Guide
 Kenan & Kel
 The Troop
 Max & Shred
 Big Time Rush
 I'm in the Band
 Zeke and Luther

Japanese Animes 
 Akudama Drive
 Attack on Titan
 Bleach: Thousand-Year Blood War
 Bleach
 Dramatical Murder
 Death Note
 Death Parade
 Gintama'
 Gin Tama
 Humanoid Monster Bem
 Kingdom
 Marvel Anime
 Magic Kaito
 One Piece
 Robotics;Notes
 Terror in Resonance
 The Promised Neverland
 The Perfect Insider
 Xuan Yuan Sword Luminary

Motoring 
 The Donut Show
 /Drive
 Drive on NBCSN
 Extreme Fails
 Jay Leno's Garage
 Mobil 1 The Grid
 Mobil 1: The Grid
 Mobil1 TheGrid
 Ridiculous Rides
 Pimp My Ride
 Targa Trophy
 Top Gear
 Top Gear USA
 Yianni: Supercar Customiser

Sports 
 Enfusion Kickboxing
 Extreme E
 Extreme E: Electric Odyssey
 Extreme E Highlights
 Extreme E: Shakedown Show
 The Football Review
 The Road to Brazil
 Formula E
 Formula One
 Formula One: F1 TV
 Formula One Highlights
 Formula One: How the Season Was Won
 Formula One: Season Review
 GT World Challenge Highlights
 GT World Challenge Asia
 GT World Highlights
 Global Football
 National Icons
 International Boxing Organization
 International Fight League
 Professional Fighters League
 PFL: Challenge Series 2022
 Ultimate Tag
 WWE Raw
 WWE SmackDown
 WWE Main Event
 WWE Afterburn
 WWE Premium Live Events
 WWE Superstars
 WWE Wal3ooha
 TNA iMPACT
 TNA Xplosion

Films

North American films 
 2 Fast 2 Furious
 Bumblebee
 Fast & Furious
 Fast & Furious 6
 Fast Five
 The Fast and the Furious
 The Fast and the Furious: Tokyo Drift
 The Fate of the Furious
 First Blood
 Furious 7
 The Mummy
 The Mummy Returns
 The Mummy: Tomb of the Dragon Emperor
 The Mummy
 The Rock
 Rambo
 Rambo: First Blood Part II
 Rambo III
 Rambo: Last Blood
 The Sum of All Fears
 Transformers
 Transformers: Age of Extinction
 Transformers: Dark of the Moon
 Transformers: The Last Knight
 Transformers: Revenge of the Fallen
 X2
 X2: X-Men United
 X-Men 2
 Zero Dark Thirty

James Bond films 
 Casino Royale
 Diamonds Are Forever
 Die Another Day
 Dr. No
 For Your Eyes Only
 From Russia with Love
 GoldenEye
 Goldfinger
 Licence to Kill
 Live and Let Die
 The Living Daylights
 The Man with the Golden Gun
 Moonraker
 Octopussy
 On Her Majesty's Secret Service
 Quantum of Solace
 Skyfall
 Spectre
 The Spy Who Loved Me
 Thunderball
 Tomorrow Never Dies
 A View to a Kill
 The World Is Not Enough
 You Only Live Twice

Korean-language films 
 Sympathy for Mr. Vengeance

Spanish films 
 The Invisible Guest

Turkish films 
 Fetih 1453
 Red Istanbul

Hindi-language films 
 Boss
 Bullett Raja
 D-Day
 Dabangg
 Dabangg 2
 Dabangg 3
 Force
 Force 2
 Game
 Jai Ho
 Kick
 Krrish 3
 Mardaani
 Once Upon ay Time in Mumbai Dobaara!
 R... Rajkumar
 Ra.One
 Race
 Shivaay
 Shootout at Wadala
 Tevar

Overview 

MBC Action is MBC Group’s action-packed channel that targets young Arabic males. It delivers the best in high-octane Western series, movies and action.

MBC Group continues to evolve and deliver the latest in Global Entertainment and content by airing most recent series in the US, in addition to new episodes of existing series that have just been released. This dynamic strategy will affect two of MBC Groups channels, namely MBC Action and MBC 4 and have commenced on January 15. Both Channel offerings will now consist of a 7-day daily block of the best in International shows and will offer their viewers an exclusive destination for the most-anticipated TV shows, for free.

MBC Groups contemporary strategy is testament to our dedication to providing our loyal viewers with content that is up-to-date and puts them on par with the Global scale of entertainment. It further distinguishes our channels as the ultimate destinations for the latest in International drama, delivered free to the Arab world, commented Ali Jaber, Group TV Director at MBC Group.

The new and updated series will be aired from Saturdays to Wednesdays while Thursdays and Fridays are allocated to the current running series, with DOUBLE UPS, for viewers to eventually catch up with the updated episodes/seasons.

The new content on MBC 4 include: The Ringer (Season 1), Secret Circle (Season 1), The Vampire Diaries (Season 3); while the new content on MBC Action will include: Hawaii FIVE-o (Season 2), The Mentalist (Season 4), Nikita (Season 2), NCIS (Season 9), WWE, and Alcatraz, a brand new US series, the latest from JJ Abrams.

MBC ACTION (an indigenous adrenaline-packed channel targeting young males); IN late 2009, MBC Action began airing new Western and Turkish series in a "day-and-date" strategy, providing viewers in the MENA region with US & Turkey, United States, United Kingdom, Japan, Spain drama series, less than a week after their latest episode's premiere in the Japan, United States and Turkey. These series include: Alcatraz, Blue Bloods, La Fortuna, NCIS, The Mentalist, Hawaii Five-0 V, Hawaii Five-0, The Mentalist, Blue Bloods, Bleach: Thousand-Year Blood War, Mahkum, Ali Reda, Nikita, NCIS: Los Angeles, Elementary and The Vampire Diaries.; while the new content on MBC Action will include: Hawaii Five-0 (Season 3), The Mentalist (Season 5), Nikita (Season 3), NCIS (Season 10), Hawaii Five-0 (Season 2), The Mentalist (Season 4), Nikita (Season 2), NCIS (Season 9), NCIS (Season 11), WWE, and Alcatraz, a brand new US series, the latest from JJ Abrams.

MBC ACTION launched in 2007 with the latest action packed movies, dramas and thrillers targeting young Arab males. The new addition proved to be an instant success. Since then, it has been growing aggressively and even more so since it started developing localized content that appeals to the passions of Arab men.
MBC Action launched in 2007 with the latest action packed movies, dramas and thrillers targeting young Arab males. The new addition proved to be an instant success. Since then, it has been growing aggressively and even more so since it started developing localized content that appeals to the passions of Arab men.
The channel is also considered, the only Arab male entertainment destination in the region; delivering a focused and dynamic 360 experience, which extends out of TV, into on-ground, online and social media.

In 2009, the channel began broadcasting the latest series to coincide with its broadcast in the United States of America and Turkey. Since its launch, the channel has been keen to show the latest and strongest Western and Turkish entertainment programmes.

Pan-Arab satellite broadcaster MBC has unveiled its new season of exclusive US TV series set to be aired for the first time in the Middle East in January 2009, following the conclusion of multi-year programming output deals with Hollywood studios.

"The series are now airing closer to the US airing dates, assuring our loyal viewers our solid commitment to satisfying their discerning needs to be up to date with latest US dramas," MBC said in a statement.

MBC Action launched in 2007 and is the Arab world’s first channel exclusively geared towards action, thriller, horror, action-packed, science-fiction, adventure, fantasy, Adrenaline and Action-Packed with men’s interests at its core. MBC Action is one of Dubai-based MBC's ten pan-regional TV channels, tailored towards men and Action-packed adrenaline with a mix of top-rated Western and Turkish and Korean and Latin content shows. MBC Action focuses on acquiring international dramas, which are dubbed into Arabic, Western series (also subtitled into Arabic), in addition to Korean content (also dubbed into Arabic).

Popular in the region for showing the latest in western entertainment the channel shows everything from science fiction programs such as Buffy the Vampire Slayer, The X-Files and Lie to Me. All of the programs are translated to Arabic with the exception of the news shows which air live. The channel shows everything from Dramedy programs, such as Las Vegas and Alias. MBC Action Finally, MBC Action has a long-standing deal with Nickelodeon to air their teen’s shows and programs, which in return are subtitled into Arabic. MBC Action started airing Nick shows including The Thundermans and Drake & Josh.

As well as the new series, MBC Action is home to hugely popular Turkish soaps dubbed into Arabic. who has signed up to work The channel does not show any film that contains extreme forms of violence. MBC Max even has slightly more censorship than MBC 2 more often than MBC 2, since the majority of Hollywood films, but mostly with the audio simply to remove the majority of a certain film's bad language, as well as bigger cuts of other censored and sexual scenes. The channel also broadcasts the latest top-rated Western entertainment shows. as well as a film for each day. while others all live action shows are subtitled. Shahid is the largest premium VOD service in the world outside of China, the US, and India. Extremely popular in the region In addition to showing well-liked television shows.

MBC Action is also well-know for being the only channel in the Middle East to broadcast which attracts young male adults with action and thriller genre.

MBC Action started airing Nickelodeon & TeenNick & NickMusic & Nick at Nite shows including Power Rangers, The Troop, Supah Ninjas, Big Time Rush, Fred: The Show, The Thundermans and Drake & Josh following the closure of Nickelodeon Arabia & TeenNick & NickMusic & Nick at Nite & MTV Middle East in 2011.

Among the live action titles in the latest MBC3 Nickelodeon deal are Fred: The Show, played by online phenomenon Lucas Cruickshank, Power Rangers, Supah Ninjas and The Troop.

Nickelodeon content will continue to air on MBC Action.

MBC Action displays American series, like Angel, Buffy the Vampire Slayer, Lie to Me, and others all translated to Arabic., which features Hollywood movies and predominantly US television series.

The channel mostly broadcasts American Hollywood movies but it also seldom features British, Canadian, French, Indian,  Chinese and other foreign films. MBC Action has managed to negotiate long-term deals with the top Hollywood studios, securing first-run right and ensuring a steady flow of the top box-office movies.

The channel largely targets the Arabic audience, especially young adults, having an important popularity among Arab viewers.

MBC  Action offers an impressive line-up of programs up to 3 months before any other channel. The line-up will include the new dubbed Turkish soap 'Mirna Wa Khalil' starring actor Kivanc Tatlitug, who has become an iconic male figure in the Middle East after the huge success of 'Noor' series in which he played the role of "Muhannad". Before this channel was launched, all its shows were broadcast on MBC 2.  However, a few years after launching MBC 2, all programs except for movies were separated into MBC Action, so that MBC 2 will only show movies.

Since late 2009, MBC Action begun airing new Arabic and Western and Turkish series in a "day-and-date" strategy, aiming to provide viewers in the MENA region with fresh content, less than a week after their same day as the latest episode's premiere in the Japan, Spain, United States and Turkey and United Kingdom. These series include: Alcatraz, Blue Bloods, La Fortuna, Bleach: Thousand-Year Blood War, Hawaii Five-0, The Vampire Diaries, Elementary, Çarpışma, 20 Dakika, The Mentalist, V, Tatar Ramazan, NCIS, NCIS: Los Angeles, Nikita, Arıza and "Mahkum - Şehrin Kralları".; while the new content on MBC Action will include: Hawaii Five-0 (Season 3), The Mentalist (Season 5), Nikita (Season 3), NCIS (Season 10), Hawaii Five-0 (Season 2), The Mentalist (Season 4), Nikita (Season 2), NCIS (Season 9), NCIS (Season 11), WWE, and Alcatraz, a brand new US series, the latest from JJ Abrams.

The channel also broadcasts MBC Action shows, all subtitled in-house in Arabic, such as The Sparticle Mystery, The Thundermans, Drake & Josh and the Power Rangers, and many others.

Other MBC  Action shows include popular Turkish dramas like Mahkum. (tr. "Mahkum"). Mahkum is the Turkish version of the popular Korean series Innocent Defendant; the show utilizes a format purchased from Seoul Broadcasting System.

Most of the action shows that was broadcast's in MBC 4 is now being transferd to the new channel MBC Action

Uncategorized shows
Uncategorized Shows can be divided to (e.g. Power Rangers, That's so Raven, Hannah Montana), and lastly the night movie, which is only shown on Wednesday, Thursday and Friday. The other popular Jetix show is Power Rangers. They have aired different power rangers, e.g. the most recent Jungle fury, others are Ninja storm, SPD etc., Jetix on Action.

References

External links

 Wanasah

Free-to-air
Television stations in the United Arab Emirates
Arab mass media
Men's mass media
Men's interest channels
Television channels and stations established in 2007
Middle East Broadcasting Center